The Crystals are an American vocal group that originated in New York City. Considered one of the defining acts of the girl group era in the first half of the 1960s, their 1961–1964 chart hits – including "There's No Other (Like My Baby)", "Uptown", "He's Sure the Boy I Love", "He's a Rebel", "Da Doo Ron Ron" and "Then He Kissed Me"– featured three successive female lead singers and were all produced by Phil Spector. The latter three songs were originally ranked #263, #114, and #493, respectively, on Rolling Stone magazine's list of The 500 Greatest Songs of All Time. However, two songs were dropped from the magazine's 2010 update, leaving only "He's a Rebel" at number 267. In the 2021 update, "Da Doo Ron Ron" was added back to the list at #366.

History

Formation and signing to Philles
In 1961, Barbara Alston (December 29, 1943, Baltimore, Maryland – February 16, 2018, Charlotte, North Carolina), Mary Thomas, Dolores "Dee Dee" Kenniebrew (born 1945), Myrna Giraud and Patricia "Patsy" Wright formed the Crystals with the help of Benny Wells, Alston's uncle. Soon, the quintet signed with Phil Spector's label Philles Records.

Their first hit, the gospel-influenced "There's No Other (Like My Baby)", debuted on the Billboard Hot 100 in November 1961. Originally the B-side to "Oh Yeah, Maybe Baby" (featuring Wright on lead), the stirring pop ballad was co-written by Spector and Leroy Bates and featured Barbara Alston on vocals. The recording was made late on the evening of the high school prom at the William H. Maxwell Career and Technical High School, the school attended by Barbara, Mary, and Myrna; they were still wearing their prom dresses, as they had come to the studio straight from the event. The single reached number 20 in January 1962, marking an auspicious debut for Spector's Philles label.

Brill Building songwriters Barry Mann and Cynthia Weil's "Uptown" gave the girls their second radio hit. Having an ethnic flavor with flamenco guitar and castanets, the more uptempo "Uptown" featured Alston once again emoting convincingly over a boy, though this time with class issues woven into the story. After the success of "Uptown", a pregnant Giraud was replaced by Dolores "LaLa" Brooks.

The controversial subject matter of the next single, 1962's "He Hit Me (And It Felt Like a Kiss)" (written by Carole King and Gerry Goffin and sung by Alston), resulted in limited airplay with the track only "bubbling under" the Billboard Hot 100, peaking at #123. Barbara Alston later disowned the track, stating it was "absolutely, positively, the one record that none of us liked".

"Replacement" Crystals
Soon after "He Hit Me" flopped, Phil Spector began recording singer Darlene Love and her backing group the Blossoms. The Crystals were not able to travel from New York to Los Angeles fast enough to suit the LA-based Spector, who wanted to quickly record writer Gene Pitney's "He's a Rebel" before Vikki Carr could release her version on Liberty Records. As Love and the Blossoms were also based in L.A., Spector recorded and released their version under the Crystals' banner. It was not the first time Spector would promise the Blossoms a single and release it under the Crystals name.

The song had originally been offered to The Shirelles, who turned it down because of the anti-establishment lyrics. It marked a shift in girl group thematic material, where the singer loves a "bad boy", a theme that would be amplified by later groups (especially The Shangri-Las' "Leader of the Pack").

"He's a Rebel" was the Crystals' only US #1 hit and also made the UK top 20. Their follow-up single, "He's Sure the Boy I Love", was also recorded by Love and the Blossoms. It reached #11 on the Billboard chart and features a spoken intro by Love.

"He's a Rebel" shut Pitney's own "Only Love Can Break a Heart" out of the top spot on 3 November 1962. Pitney never reached the Hot 100's summit.

"Real" Crystals return
Though it is unclear as to the level of their participation in "(Let's Dance) The Screw", the 'real' Crystals definitely began recording again under their own name in 1963. However, Thomas had departed to get married, only to join another mildly successful group, The Butterflys, along with another original Crystal, Myrna Giraud. This reduced the group to a quartet. Alston, known for her shyness and stage fright, was never comfortable with being out front, stepped down from the lead spot giving it to Dolores "LaLa" Brooks. According to Brooks, she had been doing Alston's leads in their live shows for a while.

After "(Let's Dance) The Screw", the group's next release was the classic "Da Doo Ron Ron". The song was a top 10 hit in both the US and the UK, as was the follow-up single "Then He Kissed Me", with lead vocals also sung by Brooks. LaLa also flew out to L.A to record tracks for the seasonal album, A Christmas Gift for You.

At the start of 1964, the Crystals flew to the UK for their first European live shows. "Then He Kissed Me" soared to #2 in the UK, and the Crystals also headlined the TV programs Ready Steady Go!, and Tonight at the London Palladium.

Mounting tension and break-up
Despite the steady flow of hit singles, tensions between Spector and the Crystals mounted. Already unhappy with having been replaced by Love and the Blossoms on two singles, the Crystals were even more upset when Spector began focusing much of his time on his other girl group the Ronettes. Not only did the Ronettes become Philles Records' priority act, the Ronettes actually replaced the Crystals on four album tracks on the 1963 compilation LP The Crystals Sing the Greatest Hits. As well, there were disputes about royalties, with the Crystals feeling that Spector was withholding royalty money that was owed to them.

Two failed Crystals singles followed before the band left Spector's Philles Records for United Artists Records in 1964. "Little Boy", which reached #92, was a Wall of Sound production that was layered multiple times, which meant that the vocals were hard to distinguish from the music. "All Grown Up", their final Philles single (of which two versions exist), only reached #98.

1964 also saw the departure of Wright, who was replaced by Frances Collins (aka Fatima Johnson), a dancer whom they had met while touring and mother of the rapper Prodigy; toward the end of that year Alston departed leaving the group a trio. As a trio, they recorded two singles for United Artists, "My Place" and "You Can't Tie a Good Girl Down". One more single was released by Barbara, Dee Dee and Mary on the tiny Michelle Records in 1967 ("Ring-a-Ting-a-Ling") and they disbanded in 1967 (see 1967 in music). They reunited in 1971 (see 1971 in music) and performed into at least 2018. Kenniebrew is the only original Crystal who remained active throughout their touring from the seventies to then, performing with Patricia Pritchett-Lewis, a member since 2005, and Melissa "MelSoulTree" Grant (aka Mel-Soul-Tree), a member since 2002. That trio of Crystals self released a CD project in 2010 entitled Live in Asia, recorded in Singapore. 

After living in Europe for two decades, La La Brooks returned to the US in 2001 and as of 2022 performs under her own name across the world, and as The Crystals in the UK and Canada, where she holds the trademark rights to the name. 

Barbara Alston died at a hospital in Charlotte, North Carolina, on February 16, 2018, at age 74.

Contemporary usage
"Then He Kissed Me" was the opening song to which Elisabeth Shue danced around her bedroom in Adventures in Babysitting (1987); it was the song in which Ray Liotta and Lorraine Bracco enter the Copacabana on their first real date in the movie Goodfellas (1990); it was featured during the episode 'Homer and Marge Turn a Couple Play' on The Simpsons (2006); it was also featured in the episode 'Stand By Meg' on Family Guy (2018). It was also covered by Asobi Seksu and used on their live album. "Da Doo Ron Ron" was played during a scene in a dance club in the 1979 film Quadrophenia, and by Russel/Harold Ramis to train ESL students in the 1981 comedy Stripes, "He Hit Me (and It Felt like a Kiss)" was used in the episode 'Mystery Date' on Mad Men (2012).

Crystal was the name of one of the girl group-inspired street urchin characters in the musical Little Shop of Horrors, along with Chiffon and Ronnette. Amy Winehouse cited "He Hit Me (And It Felt Like a Kiss)" as an influence when writing her album Back to Black. The American singer Lana Del Rey used the same phrase in the song "Ultraviolence" in the album of the same name.

Band members

Timeline

Discography

Albums

Studio albums
1962: Twist Uptown
1963: He's a Rebel (US #131)
1986: He's a Rebel featuring Lala Brooks

Compilation albums
1963: The Crystals Sing the Greatest Hits, Volume 1
1975: The Crystals Sing Their Greatest Hits
1988: Greatest Hits
1990: Greatest Hits
1992: The Best of the Crystals
2004: One Fine Day
2011: Da Doo Ron Ron: The Very Best of the Crystals
2016: Playlist : The Very Best of the Crystals

Singles

References

Bibliography
Clemente, John (2000). Girl Groups — Fabulous Females That Rocked The World. Iola, Wisc. Krause Publications. pp. 276. 
Clemente, John (2013). Girl Groups — Fabulous Females Who Rocked The World. Bloomington, IN Authorhouse Publications. pp. 623.  (sc);  (e).

External links
 Official website of the latest incarnation of the Crystals
 La La Brooks former lead singer of The Crystals
 Crystals Biography I
 Crystals Biography II
 Crystals Discography I
 Crystals Discography II

American pop music groups
African-American girl groups
African-American musical groups
Musical groups from New York City
Philles Records artists
Musical groups established in 1960
Musical groups disestablished in 1967
1960 establishments in New York City
1967 disestablishments in New York (state)